Zakir Berdikulov (born 28 May 1972) is a retired Tajikistani footballer.

Career statistics

International

Statistics accurate as of match played 28 November 2000

International goals

Honours
Parvoz Bobojon Ghafurov
Tajik Cup (1): 2007

References

External links

1972 births
Living people
Tajikistani footballers
Tajikistan international footballers
Expatriate footballers in Uzbekistan
Tajikistani expatriate sportspeople in Uzbekistan
Association football midfielders
FK Neftchi Farg'ona players
FK Mash'al Mubarek players
FC Nasaf players
Footballers at the 1998 Asian Games
Asian Games competitors for Tajikistan